Kinabalu was a federal constituency in Sabah, Malaysia, that was represented in the Dewan Rakyat from 1969 to 2004.

The federal constituency was created in the 1966 redistribution and was mandated to return a single member to the Dewan Rakyat under the first past the post voting system.

History
It was abolished in 2004 when it was redistributed.

Representation history

State constituency

Election results

References

Defunct Sabah federal constituencies